The trench watch (wristlet) was a type of watch that came into use by the military during World War I, as pocket watches were not practical in combat. It was a transitional design between pocket watches and wristwatches, incorporating features of both.

Background
The first watch that somebody adapted to wear on a wrist is unknown.  The first series of purpose-made men’s wristwatches was produced by Girard-Perregaux in 1880 for the German Navy. During World War I numerous companies, including Omega, Rolex, Longines, Elgin and others produced wristwatches for the military.  These watches were of virtually identical style with an enamel dial, wide white numerals and a luminescent radium hour hand. Often they did not bear the name of the manufacturer, though the movement, originally designed in the 1890s for ladies’ pendant watches, was marked "Swiss".
  

From pocket watches those trench watches inherited hinged front and back covers. The lugs for a strap looked like a thick wire attachment to the classical round shape of pocket watches rather than an integrated part of the body of the later and modern wristwatches.

The name "wristlet" was used until the early 1930s and was eventually replaced by the modern name "wristwatch".

References

Notes

Citations

External links

.
.

Watches
Military equipment of World War I